Currans Hill is a suburb of Sydney in the state of New South Wales, Australia. It is 60 km (37 mi) south-west of the Sydney central business district, in the local government area of Camden Council and is part of the Macarthur region.

History
The area now known as Currans Hill was originally home to the Muringong, southernmost of the Darug people. In 1805 John Macarthur established his property at Camden where he raised merino sheep.

People

Demographics
In the 2016 census, there were 5,309 residents in Currans Hill. Aboriginal and Torres Strait Islander people made up 3.2% of the population. The median age of people in Currans Hill (State Suburbs) was 31 years. Children aged 0–14 years made up 26.9% of the population and people aged 65 years and over made up 5.8% of the population. In Currans Hill (State Suburbs), 79.9% of people were born in Australia. The next most common countries of birth were England 3.0%, New Zealand 1.4%, Philippines 1.1%, Chile 0.7% and FijI 0.6%.  82.9% of people spoke only English at home. Other languages spoken at home included Spanish at 2.1%. The most common responses for religion were Catholic 30.3%, No Religion 23.8% and Anglican 20.8%.

Governance 

Currans Hill is part of the central ward of Camden Council represented by Ashleigh Cagney, Theresa Fedeli (currently deputy mayor of Camden), and Rob Mills. Peter Sidgreaves is currently the local mayor. The suburb is contained within the federal electorate of Macarthur, represented by Michael Freelander (Labor), and the state electorate of Camden, currently held by Chris Patterson (Liberal).

References

External links
  [CC-By-SA]

Suburbs of Sydney
Towns in the Macarthur (New South Wales)
Camden Council (New South Wales)